Apollo 100 was a short-lived British instrumental group, that had a U.S. Billboard Hot 100 top 10 hit with the Johann Sebastian Bach–inspired single "Joy" in 1972.

History
Apollo 100 was founded by arranger and multi-instrumentalist Tom Parker, who was known for his arrangements from the Young Blood catalogue, such as the Top 20 American hit "Chirpy Chirpy Cheep Cheep" and a number of Don Fardon's recordings. Parker had played keyboards, clarinet, saxophone, trumpet, trombone, and a number of other instruments from an early age, and entered the music industry as a session musician by the 1960s. In the intervening time, he associated with a number of groups, including The Mark Leeman 5, Jimmy James and the Vagabonds, and Eric Burdon with the New Animals.

Parker formed Apollo 100 in the latter part of 1971 with fellow session musicians drummer Clem Cattini, guitarist Vic Flick, guitarist Zed Jenkins, percussionist Jim Lawless, and bassist Brian Odgers. In December 1971, they released their first single, "Joy", an electrified arrangement by Clive Scott of Bach's "Jesu, Joy of Man's Desiring". The single rose to number 6 on the Billboard Hot 100 in the US. None of their subsequent efforts were as successful, and they broke up in 1973.

Parker went on to form the New London Chorale.

Soundtrack appearances
Apollo 100's first single "Joy", released from their premiere album Joy, has subsequently been featured in the soundtracks of the films Boogie Nights, One Day in September, and The 40-Year-Old Virgin, as well as the television series The Man Who Fell to Earth. While not featured in the Battle of the Sexes soundtrack, the song was played during a scene in the movie and was cited in the end credits.
The song Mendelssohn's 4th appears in Gaslit S1E4 as the backing track of a montage.

Charting discography

Studio albums

Compilation albums

Singles

References 

British instrumental musical groups